Disfluency is a 2018 American short film directed by Laura Holliday and starring Libe Barer. Disfluency is a short film that follows a young woman through her daily life, from her passive usage of the phrase "I'm sorry," to her being raped and the emotional aftermath.

Cast
Libe Barer as Jane
Dylan Arnold as Mark
Julia Barrett-Mitchell as Kelsey
Yoshi Sudarso as Sean
Jon Berry as Professor
Kelly L. George as Nurse
Garrett Louis as Brendon
Ella Shockey as Doe.

References

External links
 

2018 films
2018 short films
American short films
2010s English-language films